Zorica Brunclik (born 29 June 1955) is a Serbian singer. Known for her signature hot pink colored hair, she is recognized as one of the most successful Serbian folk singers.

Early life 
Zorica Brunclik was born on 29 June 1955 in Belgrade, Yugoslavia to Serb mother and Czech-Greek father. Her parents divorced during her early years. She grew up between Smederevo and Požarevac. According to Brunclik, her mother, who predominately raised her and her three brothers, was financially struggling living off of one paycheck. 

Brunclik graduated from the Faculty of Economics at the University of Niš.

Career
In 1969, Brunclik was introduced to singing by folk singer Bora Spužić Kvaka. After several years of performing as a working singer, with the help from songwriter Novica Urošević she released her first single "Ne daj da nas rastave" in 1974 under PGP-RTB. Two years later, Brunclik released her debut studio album. Over the years, she has collectively released 27 albums. Having sold 15 million records in total, she is recognized as one of the commercially most successful Serbian folk singers of all time. Some of her well-known songs include: "A tebe nema" (1982), "Avlije, avlije" (1991), "Kada bi me pitali", "Što se mala uobrazi" (1995), "Otkopčano jeleče", "Tamo gde si ti" (1998) and "Ne dam ovo malo duše" (2002). Additionally, Brunclik has received numerous accolades, including the National Music Artist of Serbia award from the Union of Music Artists of Serbia (SEMUS) in May 2021. 

On 11 November 2014, Brunclik celebrated forty years of her career with a solo concert in the Belgrade Arena, titled Sve je ljubav (Everything is Love). The live show featured guest performances from more than thirty regional musicians, including: Lepa Brena, Ceca, Dragana Mirković, Vesna Zmijanac, Saša Matić, Aca Lukas, Željko Joksimović, Sinan Sakić, Ana Bekuta and Aco Pejović. On 28 June 2022, she held a concert in the Tašmajdan Center to celebrate close to fifty years of work. Footage from the concert aired on the Radio Television of Serbia on January 1 the following year. 

Outside her career in music, she starred in the movies Kakav deda takav unuk (1983) and Špijun na štiklama (1988). Between March and June 2010, Brunclik participated on the second season of the reality television show Farma, where she placed 6th. She also served as a judge on the singing competitions Zvezde Granda (2013-2015) and Pinkove Zvezde (2016-2017).

Personal life
Brunclik was married four times. Since 1985, she has been married to Serbian accordion player and music director, Miroljub Aranđelović Kemiš. Brunclik has three daughters and one son. 

Reportedly, she was a close personal friend with Serbian politician and wife of Slobodan Milošević, Mirjana Marković, and was a member of the Yugoslav Left. Brunclik stated that she and her family faced inconveniences from the protestors several dyas after the overthrow of Slobodan Milošević on 5 October 2000. She has publicly endorsed Aleksandar Vučić.

Discography

 Ne daj da nas rastave (1976)
 Aj, mene majka jednu ima (1977)
 Između Mene i tebe (1979)
 Tri noći ljubavi (1979)
 Odakle si sele (1980)
 Pahuljica (1981)
 Ako te poljubim (1981)
 Radosti moja (1982)
 Ti si moja najslađa bol (1983)
 Uteši me (1984)
 Ja sam tvoja karamela (1985)
 Neću da te menjam (1986)
 Ne dam da mi krila lome (1987)
 Muke moje (1988)
 Eh da je sreće (1989)
 Rođeni jedno za drugo (1990)
 Ja znam (1992)
 Branili su našu ljubav (1993)
 Kada bi me pitali (1995)
 Zorica Brunclik (1996)
 Dunjo mirisna (1997)
 Zorica Brunclik (1998)
 Ej, sudbino (2000)
 Težak je ovaj život (2002)
 Rođendana dva (2004)
 Zorica Brunclik (2006)
 Trebaš mi (2017)

Filmography

Festivals 
 1977 Hit of the Summer – "Zivot si mi odneo sa sobom"
 1978 Ilidža Music Festival – "Kad udjes u moj dom"
 1978 Hit Parade – "Cuti ja te molim"
 1982 Hit Parade – "Plava Ljubicica"
 1986 Hit Parade – "Ti si mi bio sve"
 1988 Ilidža Music Festival – "Ne imao srece"
 1990 MESAM – "Evo vec je Bozic"
 1990 Šumadijski Sabor – "Ja Znam"
 1992 MESAM – "Sve je ljubav"
 1992 Šumadijski Sabor – "Ubile me oci zelene"
 1993 Moravski Biseri – "Veliki grad"
 1993 Šumadijski Sabor – "Na kestenu starom"
 1994 Moravski Biseri – "Tako je kod Srba"
 1994 Šumadijski Sabor – "Niko nije rodjen da bude sam"
 1996 MESAM – "Prazna ostala mi dusa"
 2006 Grand Festival – "Dan po dan"
 2010 Grand Festival – "Moja zakletvo"

References

External links
 
 

1955 births
Living people
Singers from Belgrade
Yugoslav women singers
20th-century Serbian women singers
Serbian folk singers
Serbian turbo-folk singers
Serbian people of Slovak descent
21st-century Serbian women singers